Primaire is a 2016 French drama film directed by Hélène Angel.

Plot
Florence is a school teacher devoted to her students. When she meets little Sasha, a troubled child, she will do everything possible to save him, even if she abandons her life as a mother or a woman and even call into question her vocation. Florence will realize little by little that there is no age to learn ...

Cast
 Sara Forestier as Florence Mautret
 Vincent Elbaz as Mathieu
 Albert Cousi as Denis Mautret
 Ghillas Bendjoudi as Sacha Drouet
 Guilaine Londez as Madame Duru
 Hannah Brunt as Charlie
 Olivia Côte as Marlène Peillard
 Patrick d'Assumçao as M. Sabatier
 Laure Calamy as Christina Drouet
 Lucie Desclozeaux as Laure
 Denis Sebbah as M. Hadjaj
 Frédéric Boismoreau as Rémi
 Hervé Caullery as M. Teboul
 Jules Gaboriau as Jean-Philippe

References

External links
 

2016 films
French drama films
2010s French-language films
Films set in France
2016 drama films
2010s French films